Jeygaran Rural District is a rural district (dehestan) in Ozgoleh District, Salas-e Babajani County, Kermanshah Province, Iran. At the 2006 census, its population was 2,867, in 544 families. The rural district has 25 villages.

References 

Rural Districts of Kermanshah Province
Salas-e Babajani County